Sandi Tan (born 1972 in Singapore) is a film critic, writer, and filmmaker. After attending the University of Kent, she wrote as the film critic for The Straits Times from 1995 to 1997 before attending Columbia University's film school and earning a Master of Fine Arts in Screenwriting. Her first short film, Moveable Feast, was her entry in the 1996 Singapore International Film Festival.

Tan has worked as the director for short films Moveable Feast (1996) and Gourmet Baby (2001), but is best known for her full-length 2018 documentary, Shirkers. Shirkers made its debut at the 2018 Sundance Film Festival, at which it won the Directing Award: World Cinema Documentary. Her debut novel, The Black Isle, was published by Grand Central Publishing in 2012 and was generally well received by critics and readers.

Tan's novel Lurkers is forthcoming from Soho Press. She will be directing a film adaptation of Elif Batuman's novel The Idiot.

Filmography

References

External links

1972 births
21st-century American women writers
21st-century American writers
American documentary filmmakers
American film directors
Living people
People from Singapore
Singaporean emigrants to the United States
Singaporean film directors
Singaporean women film directors
Singaporean writers
American women documentary filmmakers
Alumni of the University of Kent